The 2007 American Handball Men's Youth Championships took place in Cascavel from September 4 – 8.

Results

Final standing

References 

2007 in handball
Pan American Men's Youth Handball Championship
Pan American Men's Youth Handball Championship